Clarkia amoena (farewell to spring or godetia; syn. Godetia amoena) is a flowering plant native to western North America, found in coastal hills and mountains from British Columbia south to the San Francisco Bay Area.

It is an annual plant growing to 1 m tall, with slender, linear leaves 2–7 cm long and 2–6 mm broad. The flowers are pink to pale purple, with four broad petals 1.5–6 cm long. The fruit is a dry capsule, which splits open when mature to release the numerous seeds.

Three subspecies are currently recognised, though intermediate forms are commonly found:
Clarkia amoena subsp. amoena
Clarkia amoena subsp. huntiana
Clarkia amoena subsp. whitneyi (Whitney's farewell to spring)

Farewell to spring is commonly cultivated as a garden plant, and cultivated varieties are known.

References

External links

Jepson Flora Project: Clarkia amoena
Clarkia amoena at CalPhotos, UC Berkeley
Plants of British Columbia: Clarkia amoena

amoena
Flora of the West Coast of the United States
Flora of British Columbia
Flora of Oregon
Flora of California
Plants described in 1918
Garden plants of North America
Drought-tolerant plants
Flora without expected TNC conservation status